This is a list of Nigerian films released in 2012.

Films

See also
List of Nigerian films

References

External links
2012 films at the Internet Movie Database

2012
Lists of 2012 films by country or language
Films